Racinaea tenuispica is a plant species in the genus Racinaea. This species is native to Venezuela and Ecuador.

References

tenuispica
Flora of Venezuela
Flora of Ecuador